The Scottish Football League ("SFL") was established in 1890, initially as an amateur league as professionalism had not been legalised in Scottish football. In 1893 a Second Division was formed, with the existing single division renamed the First Division. The Second Division was discontinued during the First World War but revived in 1921. A Third Division was added in 1923 but collapsed three years later as a number of its member clubs found themselves unable to complete their fixtures for financial reasons, with many folding altogether. After the Second World War the divisions were rebranded as Division A and Division B and a Division C was added. This included a mixture of new member clubs and the reserve teams of clubs from the higher divisions, but this division was dropped in 1955.

A major re-organisation of the SFL in 1975 led to the existing two divisions being split into three smaller divisions, with a new Premier Division at the highest level. This structure remained in place until 1998, when the teams then in the Premier Division broke away to form the Scottish Premier League, which supplanted the Premier Division as the highest level of football in Scotland. In 2013 the two leagues merged to form the new Scottish Professional Football League, ending the 123-year existence of the SFL.

For the whole history of the SFL, there was no mechanism in place for club(s) at the bottom of the league to be relegated. A number of clubs who resigned or were expelled from the SFL went on to play in non-league football, either in senior leagues such as the East of Scotland Football League or in leagues governed by the Scottish Junior Football Association (SJFA). Whenever a club left the league (for example, when Gretna was liquidated in 2008), a new club was elected in its place. This closed-shop system was changed soon after the leagues merged, when a play-off between the bottom-placed SPFL club and the winner of a play-off between the Highland League and Lowland League champions was introduced in 2015. Edinburgh City became the first club to be promoted to the SPFL when they won a playoff against East Stirlingshire in 2016.

Clubs
The tables show the first and last seasons in which each club competed in the league. Some clubs' membership was intermittent between their first and last seasons. Clubs shown in bold were among the founder members of the league. Where a former club has become defunct, any phoenix club formed as a successor side is noted.

Former member clubs currently playing in the SPFL

Other former member clubs

See also
 List of Scottish Professional Football League clubs
 Timeline of Scottish football

Notes

References

 
Former Scottish
 
Scottish former
Clubs